Ahmed Toufiq (born 22 June 1943) is a Moroccan historian and novelist who is serving as Minister for Islamic Affairs in the government of Morocco since 2002.

Biography
Toufiq was born on 22 June 1943 in the Marigha Village in the High Atlas. After completing his primary and secondary studies in Marrakech, he enrolled at the Faculty of Letters and Human Sciences of Rabat, where he got a bachelor's degree in history in 1968, then a master's degree in history. Toufiq also holds a certificate of Archaeology. He presented his PhD in 1979 on the subject of social history in the Moroccan rural areas in the 19th century. He started his career as a teacher at L'École Normale Supérieure de Marrakech and taught in a high school in Rabat. Thereafter, he joined the Faculty of Letters and Human Sciences in Rabat, where he served in various roles from 1970 to 1989; lecturer, assistant professor, associate professor. He was later appointed director of the Institute of African Studies at the Mohammed V University in 1989 and held the position for six years until 1995. From 1995 to 2002, he worked as director of the National Library of Morocco. In 1989 Ahmed Toufiq received his first Moroccan Book Prize for his novel Shajarat Hinna' Wa Qamar (A Tree of Henna and a Moon). In 2001, he served as a Visiting Professor of Islamic Studies at Harvard Divinity School, affiliated with its Center for the Study of World Religions. 

In November 2002, Toufiq was appointed to the government as Minister for Islamic Affairs. He is also a personal advocate of interfaith dialogue and currently sits on the Board of World Religious Leaders for The Elijah Interfaith Institute. Toufiq is a Sufi.

Bibliography
Historical studies
 La société marocaine au XIXe siècle - Inoultane 1850 - 1912 
 Islam et développement
 Les juifs de Demnat
 Le Maroc et l'Afrique Occidentale à travers les âges

Novels
Abu Musa's Women Neighbors (translated by Roger Allen, from Jarat Abi Musa, 1997)
Al Sayl (The stream, 1998)
Shujayrat Hinna' Wa Qamar (translated by Roger Allen, Moon and Henna Tree, 2013)

Further reading
Marvine Howe, Morocco: The Islamist Awakening and Other Challenges, p. 343, Oxford University Press, 2005

References

1943 births
Shilha people
Berber writers
Government ministers of Morocco
Living people
Male novelists
Academic staff of Mohammed V University
20th-century Moroccan historians
Moroccan male writers
Moroccan novelists
Moroccan Sufis
People from Marrakesh
Mohammed V University alumni